Rocky Aur Rani Ki Prem Kahani is an upcoming Indian Hindi-language romantic comedy film  directed by Karan Johar and produced by Dharma Productions. The film stars Dharmendra, Jaya Bachchan, Shabana Azmi, Ranveer Singh and Alia Bhatt.

Principal photography commenced in August 2021. The film is scheduled to release on 28 July 2023.

Cast 
Dharmendra
 Jaya Bachchan 
 Shabana Azmi 
Ranveer Singh as Rocky Kathuria  
 Alia Bhatt as Rani Chatterjee
 Tota Roy Chowdhury
 Saswata Chatterjee 
 Karmveer Choudhary 
 Arjun Bijlani
 Shraddha Arya
 Sriti Jha
 Arjit Taneja
 Churni Ganguly
 Amrita Puri as Amrita Mehra, Rocky's girlfriend
 Sara Ali Khan in a cameo appearance

Production
Principal photography of the film commenced on 20 August 2021. The first schedule took place in Mumbai, before moving to Moscow in September 2021 for a song shoot with Singh and Bhatt. In October 2021, second schedule commenced in Delhi.

The next schedule was scheduled for early 2022 but it was delayed due to the Omicron variant spread. Finally, the third schedule kicked off in April 2022 near Mumbai and Delhi. on 1 August 2022, Dharma Productions released a video announcing the film's wrap except a song, whose shoot was delayed to March 2023 due to Bhatt's pregnancy. Amrita Puri will be playing Ranveer Singh's girlfriend in the film.

Release
The film was initially scheduled to release on 10 February 2023 but was postponed due to delay in shooting. It was slated to release on 28 April 2023 but to avoid clash with Mani Ratnam's Ponniyin Selvan: II, it is now scheduled to release on 28 July 2023.

References 
15)rocky aur rani ki prem kahani review by sn. Retrieved 2 March 2023

External links 
 

Upcoming Indian films
Indian romance films
Upcoming films
Upcoming Hindi-language films
2020s Hindi-language films